is a Japanese gymnast. He has won two Olympic medals in the men's artistic team all-around – silver in 2012 (London) and gold in 2016 (Rio de Janeiro).

Career 
Kato together with Japanese teammates (Hiroki Ishikawa, Shogo Nonomura, Yusuke Tanaka, and Chihiro Yoshioka) competed at the 2013 Summer Universiade in Kazan where Team Japan won the bronze medal. He won gold in Floor and bronze in Horizontal Bar final.
Kato competed at the 2013 World Championships along with Kōhei Uchimura, Kenzo Shirai, Koji Yamamuro, Kohei Kameyama, and Kazuhito Tanaka. He competed in the all around final and placed second, nearly two points behind teammate Uchimura.

Personal life 
Kato is the son of Hiroyuki Kato, a coach of Japan National team for gymnastics.

References

External links 
 

1993 births
Living people
Japanese male artistic gymnasts
Olympic gymnasts of Japan
Gymnasts at the 2012 Summer Olympics
Gymnasts at the 2016 Summer Olympics
Olympic gold medalists for Japan
Olympic silver medalists for Japan
Olympic medalists in gymnastics
Medalists at the 2012 Summer Olympics
Medalists at the 2016 Summer Olympics
People from Sōka
Medalists at the World Artistic Gymnastics Championships
Universiade medalists in gymnastics
Universiade gold medalists for Japan
Universiade bronze medalists for Japan
Medalists at the 2013 Summer Universiade
21st-century Japanese people